Aron Shanagher (born 1997) is an Irish hurler who plays as a left corner-forward for the Clare senior team.

Career

Born in Shannon, County Clare, Shanagher was introduced to hurling in his youth. He developed his skills at St. Caimin's Community School while simultaneously enjoying championship successes at underage levels with the Wolfe Tones club. Shanagher subsequently became a regular member of the Wolfe Tones senior team and has won one Munster medal and one championship medal in the intermediate grade.

Shanagher made his début on the inter-county scene at the age of sixteen when he first linked up with the Clare minor team. He enjoyed little success in this grade before later joining the under-21 side. Shanagher made his senior debut during the 2016 league. Since then he has won one National Hurling League medal.

Career statistics

Honours

Wolfe Tones
 Munster Intermediate Club Hurling Championship (1) : 2015
 Clare Intermediate Hurling Championship (1) : 2015

Clare
 National Hurling League (1): 2016

References

1997 births
Living people
Wolfe Tones na Sionna hurlers
Clare inter-county hurlers